John Smeaton  (born Bishopton, Renfrewshire in 1976), also known by the nickname Smeato, is a former baggage handler at Glasgow Airport. He became involved in thwarting the 2007 Glasgow Airport attack. Smeaton lives in Erskine, Renfrewshire, a town outside the city and near the airport. Brought up in Erskine, he was educated at Park Mains High School. Smeaton stood as an Independent candidate in the 2009 Glasgow North East by-election.

Glasgow Airport attack
Smeaton, a baggage handler, was off duty when he saw the incident start to develop on 30 June 2007. During his break he observed two men driving a burning jeep filled with highly flammable gas cylinders into the airport entrance. He heard three explosions and ran over to help.

It was reported that Smeaton shouted "fuckin' mon, then" and kicked Kafeel Ahmed in the groin. Ahmed suffered burns over 90% of his body and died later in hospital.

During the incident Smeaton also helped drag Michael Kerr, who also intervened in the event, to safety. Kerr had been left lying with a broken leg beside the burning jeep after also kicking Ahmed.

The incident has been described as inspiring others to take personal initiative and act decisively in a crisis. Newsagent and former policeman Mohammed Afzah would later cite Smeaton as an inspiration for his facing down and repelling a would-be armed robber.

In late July, Smeaton returned to his old job as a baggage handler at the airport. Later in the year he accepted a job as head of security at a nearby company.

On 18 December 2007, it was announced that Smeaton was to be awarded the Queen's Gallantry Medal for his actions; this was presented by the Queen at a ceremony at Buckingham Palace on 4 March 2008.

Television interviews
Following the attack, Smeaton gave television interviews to the BBC, ITV and CNN which were broadcast worldwide.

The television interviews that brought him to the attention of the world focused on his own reaction to the attack.

 After he saw the police grappling with one of the attackers, he thought:
"You're no' hitting the Polis mate, there's nae chance."

 Describing his own actions:
"So I ran straight towards the guy, we're all trying to get a kick-in at him, take a boot to subdue the guy."

 Asked by ITV News what his message to terrorists was, he said:
"Glasgow doesn't accept this. This is Glasgow; we'll set about ye."

 In his News of the World interview, he said:
"If any more extremists are still wanting to rise up and start trouble, know this: We’ll rise right back up against you. New York, Madrid, London, Paisley … we’re all in this together and make no mistake, none of us will hold back from putting the boot in."

 From an interview with Scotland Today:
"If you see the law going down then you have to step up to the plate. I mean, at the end of the day, when the law falls, we fall."

Tribute website and media attention
A tribute website set up in Smeaton's honour received 500,000 hits in its first 48 hours. The website urges visitors to buy a pint of beer for him; over 1000 pints were donated within two days. The BBC reported on 18 July 2007 that John Smeaton has pledged half of the money donated for pints of beer to the veteran's charity Erskine, which cares for former servicemen and women at five homes throughout Scotland. The balance of the money was to be used to fund a night out for those who also assisted at the incident at Glasgow Airport.

The website also called for Smeaton to make an appearance at the popular Scottish music festival, T in the Park. The website's creator said: 

He was due to take to the stage and perform a rendition of "Take the Power Back" by Rage Against the Machine.  However, T in the Park organiser Geoff Ellis said: "Through his actions at the weekend, John Smeaton absolutely epitomizes the spirit of Scotland that we are always so proud of at T in the Park. However, due to heightened security and an incredibly tight performance schedule on the Main Stage at T in the Park this year, unfortunately we can't allow him to get up on stage".

A Bebo group was also set up in dedication to Smeaton, called the John Smeaton Fan Club. Over 550 Bebo members had joined the club within 48 hours, and this page also received exposure in the Daily Record.

A Facebook group called the John Smeaton Appreciation Society was also established with over 4,000 members; this refers to Smeaton as: "Glasgow's Jack Bauer"

Smeaton was also the subject of a front-page article in The Wall Street Journal.

In the weeks after the attack, Smeaton made a variety of public appearances and interviews including appearing on the pitch at Ibrox Stadium in front of his boyhood heroes before a Rangers home game. and meeting Prime Minister Gordon Brown at 10 Downing Street. He also appeared at the Edinburgh Festival Fringe.

In September 2007 he started writing a column for the Scottish edition of The Sun newspaper every Thursday, called 'The Column That Sets Aboot Ye'.

He was invited to appear at the World Trade Center ground zero for the sixth anniversary of the September 11, 2001 attacks. He also appeared on Richard & Judy.

On 12 September 2007 he received an official audience with New York City Mayor Michael R. Bloomberg at New York City Hall. On 24 September 2007 he attended the Labour Party Conference and his exploits were referred to by Gordon Brown in his speech. He received a standing ovation from the crowd.

Smeaton revealed in an October 2007 interview with Loaded magazine journalist Jeff Maysh that he feared "a jihad or a fatwa being issued" against him, but added, "that would just be fate. I can't stop a bloke with an AK47. One thing is for certain, they'll have to kill me. They'll never take me alive." In the same month, Smeaton and other bystanders who intervened in the Glasgow Airport attack were recognised at the Pride of Britain Awards.

Awards
Smeaton was one of four members of the public who were presented with a Daily Mirror Pride of Britain award in 2007. In December 2007 Smeaton was presented with a CNN Everyday Superhero Award in New York, and awarded the Queen's Gallantry Medal.
 In the same month Smeaton was named as one of the ten "Top Scots 2007" by Scotland on Sunday.

Doubts
In March 2008 reports began to circulate in the national press that Smeaton's involvement in the incident had been exaggerated, and that others, who had done more to restrain the attackers, had not been recognised with awards such as the Queen's Gallantry Medal. Alex McIlveen, who tore a tendon in his foot while tackling burning Kafeel Ahmed, told reporters: "John Smeaton is not telling the whole truth. When it came to tackling the bombers, he didn't land a blow." Smeaton denied claims that he was a fake and pointed out that he had already stated in 2007 that he felt the press were not giving enough credit to the others involved.

2009 Glasgow North East by-election
On 25 September 2009, it was announced that Smeaton would stand as an Independent candidate in the 2009 Glasgow North East by-election called as a result of the resignation of the former Speaker of the House Michael Martin in the aftermath of the MP's expenses scandal. Smeaton was the first Jury Team-supported independent to be selected for a Westminster election, following the umbrella organisation's launch in March 2009, and their backing of 59 candidates in the 4 June 2009 European elections. Labour won the seat with 12,231 votes while Smeaton polled 258 votes; eighth amongst 13 candidates. Smeaton's by-election campaign was the subject of a BBC One documentary titled Make Me an MP, aired on 18 November 2009.

References

External links
A short documentary trying to find John Smeaton
Smeaton interview from the Observer
Smeaton interview with Loaded Magazine, by Jeff Maysh

1976 births
June 2007 UK terrorist incidents
Independent politicians in Scotland
Internet memes
Living people
People educated at Park Mains High School
People from Erskine
Recipients of the Queen's Gallantry Medal
Scottish columnists